Deudorix chalybeata is a butterfly in the family Lycaenidae. It is found on São Tomé Island.

References

Further reading
Joicey, J.J. and Talbot, G. 1926a. New forms of Lepidoptera from the island of Sao Thome, West Africa. Entomologist 59: 220–226.

Butterflies described in 1926
Deudorix
Fauna of São Tomé Island